Cavallucci is a rich Italian Christmas pastry prepared with anise, walnuts, candied fruits, coriander, and flour. They are Sienese in origin, and the name translates approximately to "little horses".  The chewy biscuits traditionally use Tuscan millefiori honey as an essential ingredient in the dough.

History
The cookies were originally imprinted with the image of a horse (cavalli is the Italian term for horses). The cookies sold today are a gentrified version of a pastry which is traceable to the reign of Lorenzo the Magnificent (1449–1492), when they were called biriquocoli.

Many hypotheses are associated with the origin of its name. According to the most popular version of the story, cavallucci were served to travelers on horseback as a source of nourishment for long trips. Along a similar vein, another speculation is that postal workers who delivered mail over long distances ate the cookies on a regular basis. Additionally surmised is that these sweets were the usual snack of servants who worked in horse stables of rich Italian aristocrats in Siena, a city which gained its fame for horse racing.

Serving
The pastry is often paired with sweet dessert wines, such as Vin Santo, and dipped into the wine before being eaten.

References

External links
Cavallucci (o morsetti) di Siena Retrieved 26 April 2013
 Cavallucci: Local Recipe in Tuscany, Italy Retrieved 26 April 2013

Italian desserts
Biscuits
Christmas food
Anise
Cuisine of Tuscany
Christmas in Italy